The internal classification of Mixtec is controversial. Many varieties are mutually unintelligible and by that criterion separate languages. In the 16th century, Spanish authorities recognized half a dozen lenguas comprising the Mixtec lengua. (See #Classical Mixtec.)  It is not clear to what extent these were distinct languages at the time.  Regardless, the colonial disintegration of the Mixtec nation and resulting isolation of local communities led to the rapid diversification of local dialects into distinct languages.  Below are some attempts at Mixtec classification by various scholars.

Geographic divisions
Josserand (1983:106) lists 5 major geographic (not linguistic) divisions of Mixtec, which together cover a total of about 25,000 square kilometers. Enclaves of Amuzgo, Trique, Cuicatec, Ixcatec, and Chocho speakers are scattered nearby.

Puebla Mixtec
Guerrero Mixtec
Mixteca Baja
Mixteca Alta
Mixteca de la Costa

Colonial divisions 
De los Reyes, in his Arte de Lengua Mixteca (1593), spoke of half a dozen lenguas in the Mixtec lengua.  To these, his contemporaries added the dialects of Guerrero:

the lengua of Teposcolula, including the major communities of Tamazulapan, Tilantongo, Texupa, and Mitlatongo (Jiménez-Moreno: Tepozcolula–Tilantongo; the prestige dialect chosen by de los Reyes)
the lengua of Yanhuitlán, incl. Coixtlahuaca, Xaltepec, and Nochixtlán (Jiménez-Moreno: Yuanhuitlán–Cuilapan)
the lengua of Tlaxiaco and Achiutla (the prestige dialect chosen by Hernández)
the lengua of the Mixteca Baja
the lengua of Cuilapa and Guaxolotitlán in the Valley of Oaxaca (Jiménez-Moreno: Cuauhxochpan–Cuyamecalco)
the lengua of the Mixteca de la Costa
the Mixtec of Guerrero

Josserand found that native mundane writing of the colonial era corresponded well to de los Reyes; based on phonological and orthographic consistencies, she divides the dialects into five groups, as follows: 
the Baja area around Huajuapan (though there were multiple varieties in Baja, more than de los Reyes recognized)
the Oaxaca Valley around Cuilapan, closely related to the next
the northeastern Alta around the Valley of Nochixtlan, including Yanhuitlan and Coixtlahuaca
the eastern Alta around the Valleys of Teposcolula and Tamasulapa
the western Alta around the Valley of Tlaxiaco, Achiutla, and Chalcatongo

Holland (1959)
The following classification is given by William R. Holland (1959), as cited in Josserand (1983:134-135). This preliminary classification is a glottochronological study of the dialects of 22 Mixtec and 4 Cuicatec towns.

Zone 1: Ixtayutla, Mechoacán, Jamiltepec, Huazolotitlán, Pinotepa Nacional
Zone 2: Ixtayutla, Mechoacán, Jamiltepec, Pinotepa de Don Luis, Pinotepa Nacional, Atoyac, Tlacamama
Zone 3: Santo Tomás Ocotepec, Santa Lucía Monte Verde, San Miguel el Grande, San Esteban Atatlahuca
Zone 4: San Rafael Guerrero
Zone 5: Juxtlahuaca
Zone 6: Santa María Peñoles, Huitepec
Zone 7: Peñoles
Zone 8: Jocoticpac / Jocotipac
Zone 9: Cuyamecalco
Zone 10: San Juan Coatzospan
Zone 11: Chigmecatitlán, Santa Catarina Tlaltempan

Holland (1959) also gives 3 areal groupings for these zones.

Costa: Zones 1, 2
Alta: Zones 3, 4, 5, 6, 7
Baja: Zones 8, 9, 10, 11

However, Josserand (1983) states that these groupings are based on flawed methodologies, including a faulty conception of the geographical layout of the Mixteca. Many towns that Holland listed as Baja are in fact Alta, and vice versa.

Arana (1960)
The following classification is given by Evangelina Arana-Osnaya (1960:257), as cited in Josserand (1983:137).

Group 1: Chigmecatitlán, Tlaltempan
Group 2: Cuyamecalco, San Juan Coatzospan
Group 3a: Huitepec, Peñoles, Santa María Peñoles, San Juan Tamazola
Group 3b: Cuilapan; probably also Xoxocotla and other towns - where Mixtec is now no longer spoken
Group 4a: San Miguel el Grande, San Esteban Atatlahuca, Santo Tomás Ocotepec, Jocoticpac; San Rafael in Guerrero
Group 4b: Mechoacán, Jamiltepec, Pinotepa de Don Luis, Ixtayutla, Huazolotitlán, Tlacamama, Pinotepa Nacional, Atoyac

Mak & Longacre (1960)
Cornelia Mak and Robert Longacre (1960) is the first reconstruction of Proto-Mixtec, which is the ancestor of Mixtec proper as opposed to Mixtecan. Below is a classification inferred from Mak & Longacre (1960) by Josserand (1983:142). 9 groups and a total of 28 towns are given.

Central Mixteca Alta: San Miguel el Grande, San Esteban Atatlahuca
Southern Mixteca Alta: Santiago Yosondúa, Santa Cruz Itundujia, San Mateo Santigui, San Pedro el Alto, San Fernando Yucucundo
Western Mixteca Alta: Santo Tomás Ocotepec
Lowland Mixteca (Mixteca de la Costa): Jicaltepec, Pinotepa de Don Luis, Mechoacán, Tlacamama, Atoyac
Mixteca Baja: San Juan Mixtepec, Juxtlahuaca
Guerrero: Metlatonoc
Puebla: Tonahuixtla, Xayacatlán, Chigmecatitlán
Eastern Mixteca Alta: Estetla, Tilantongo, Tidaa, San Juan Diuxi, Santiago Mitlatongo, Nuxaa, San Juan Tamazola
Northeastern Mixteca Alta: San Juan Coatzospan, Cuyamecalco

Spores (1967)
The following classification, based on "archaeological, ethnohistorical and modern information in his delimitation of interaction spheres within the Mixteca", is given by Richard Spores in The Mixtec Kings and Their People (1967), as cited in Josserand (1983:128). A total of 18 dialects are given.

Apoala, Apasco, Sosola; eastern frontier with Chinantec, Cuicatec, and Zapotec
Coixtlahuaca, Huautla, Tequixixtepec
Tonalá, Chila, Petlalcingo, Mariscala, Acatlán; towns on the northern frontier with Nahuatl and Tlapanec
Huajuapan
Silacayoapan; ranchos on Guerrero border
Tecomaxtlahuaca, Juxtlahuaca
Tlaxiaco, and its ranchos of Cuquila, Ñumí, Mixtepec
Teposcolula, and its ranchos; Tayata, Achiutla, and about 8 other communities, all of which use the Teposcolula market
Tilantongo, and its ranchos; Mitlatongo
Chalcatongo, San Miguel el Grande
Yucuañe, and 9 or 10 surrounding communities
Teozacoalco, Peñoles
Putla
Zacatepec
Tututepec, Jamiltepec
Yolotepec
Yanhuitlán, Chicahua, Soyaltepec, Cántaros, Coyotepec, Nochixtlán, Tonaltepec
Tamazulapan, Tejutla, Teotongo, Chilapa de Díaz

Bradley (1968, 1970)
The following classification is given by C. Henry Bradley (1970), as cited in Josserand (1983:132). A total of 11 languages are given. His classification was most likely based on SIL International's mutual intelligibility surveys.

Northern: Xayacatlán, Huajuapan, Chigmecatitlán
Northeastern: Apoala, Coatzospan, Cuyamecalco
Eastern: Peñoles, Tilantongo, Huitepec
East-central: Amoltepec
Central: Yosondúa, San Miguel, Molinos, San Esteban (Atatlahuca), Santo Tomás (Ocotepec), Mixtepec
South-central: Nuyoo–Yucuite, Itundujia
West-central: Silacayoapan–Juxtlahuaca
Western: Metlatonoc, Coicoyán
Southwestern: Ayutla
Southern: Jicaltepec, Chayuco, Zacatepec
Southeastern: Tututepec

However, Bradley (1968) had given a different classification which included only 7 languages.

Northeast: Apoala, Cuyamecalco
Northwest: Chigmecatitlán, Xayacatlán–Chazumba, Cacaloxtepec
Mixteca Baja: Mixtepec, Juxtlahuaca–Silacayoapan, Coicoyán
Guerrero: Coatzingo, Malinaltepec, Yolosochitl, Ayutla
Mixteca de la Costa: Zacatepec, Pinotepa, Ixtayutla, Jamiltepec, Tututepec
Western Mixteca Alta: Ñumí, Chalcatongo, Yosondúa, Itundujia, Atatlahuca
Eastern Mixteca Alta: Peñoles, Tilantongo

Egland & Bartholomew (1983)
Egland & Bartholomew find 29 groups at a 70% mutual-intelligibility level. The towns they tested are the following, grouped at 60% intelligibility; a question mark indicates that intelligibility testing had not been done with non-neighboring varieties.

Coatzospan–Cuyamecalco
Santa Ana Cuauhtémoc [w Cuyamecalco per E16], Coatzospan [miz]
Cuyamecalco [xtu]
Apoala, Jocotipac, Ixtaltepec, Chicahua [mip]
San Bartolo Soyaltepec [vmq]
Santiago Chazumba [xtb], Tonahuixtla, Cosoltepec [xtb], Xayacatlán de Bravo [mit], Tepejillo, Zapotitlán Palmas [mit]; Petlalcingo [mit, xtb both in the town]
[65% Xayacatlán in the other direction]
Chigmecatitlán [mii]
Nuxaá [mxy]
Estetla, Peñoles [mil]; Huitepec [mxs, mil]; Tlazoyaltepec [mqh, mil]; San Juan Tamazola [vmx]
Tidaá [mtx] (60 w Peñoles)
San Miguel Piedras [xtp]
Tilantongo [xtd]
?Ñumí–Tlacotepec
Ñumí, Nunduchi, Nicananduta, San Antonio Monteverde [xtn], Sto. Tomás Ocotepec [mie]; Yucuañe [mvg]
Tlacotepec [xtm] (69 w Atatláhuca)
Yucunicoco [vmc], San Juan Mixtepec [mix] (unidirectional intelligibility)
Nuyoo, Yucuhiti [meh]
San Esteban Atatláhuca (68 w Yosondúa) [mib], Santa Lucía Monteverde [mdv]; Molinos; Itundujía [mce]
Yosondúa (70 w Atatláhuca) [mpm], San Miguel el Grande, Chalcatongo [mig]; Yolotepec; Teita [xtj]
Santa Maria Sindihui [xts]
Silacayopan group
Cacaloxtepec [miu]
Silacayoapan, San Jorge Nuchita [mks], Ixpantepec Nieves, Santiago Tamazola, San Simón Zahuatlán, Atenango, Yucuñuti [mxb], San Miguel Ahuehuetitlán; Juxtlahuaca: Tecomastlahuaca, San Rafael Tepejillo, Juxtlahuaca, Tindú [vmc]; Cahuatache [mim]; Metlatónoc [mxv]
Coicoyán, S. M. Peras [jmx]
Guadalupe Portezuelo [mxa w Zahuatlán]
?Cuatzoquitengo [mim] (not close to Cahuatache)
Ayutla [miy] (divergent)
Amoltepec [mbz]
Tututepec (61 w Ixtayutla), Acatepec [mtu]
Chayuco–Zacatepec
San Cristobál (60 w Jicaltepec) [mxt], Mechoacán, Chayuco [mih] (69 Coicoyán)
?Ixtayutla [vmj] (80 w San Cristobál, 79/63% Amoltepec, 59 Chayuco)
Zacatepec [mza]
Jicaltepec [mio] (74 w Ixtayutla), Colorado [mjc], Tepetlapa, Sayultepec, Don Luis, [Western] Jamiltepec, Jicayán, San Lorenzo, Atoyac; Huazolotitlán [w Eastern Jamiltepec per E16]

Ethnologue
The classification of Ethnologue is largely based on Egland & Bartholomew. There is no sub-classification, only a list of 52 varieties, though these are reported to have a great range of intelligibility, from essentially none to 90% or higher.

See also
 Municipalities of Oaxaca
 Municipalities of Guerrero
 List of Oto-Manguean languages
 Oto-Manguean languages
 Mixtecan languages
 Mixtec languages
 Classification of indigenous languages of the Americas

Notes and references

 Egland, Steven, Doris Bartholomew, and Saúl Cruz Ramos. 1983. La inteligibilidad interdialectal en México: Resultados de algunos sondeos. México, D.F: Instituto Lingüístico de Verano.: https://web.archive.org/web/20151122014320/http://www-01.sil.org/mexico/sondeos/G038a-SondeosInteligibilidad.htm - Note: The 1983 date is only a reprint date. Actual publication date is 1978.
 Josserand, Judy Kathryn. 1983. Mixtec Dialect History. Ph.D. Dissertation, Tulane University.

Mixtec